Physics Letters was a scientific journal published from 1962 to 1966, when it split in two series now published by Elsevier:

Physics Letters A: condensed matter physics, theoretical physics, nonlinear science, statistical physics, mathematical and computational physics, general and cross-disciplinary physics (including foundations), atomic, molecular and cluster physics, plasma and fluid physics, optical physics, biological physics and nanoscience.
Physics Letters B: nuclear physics, theoretical nuclear physics, experimental high-energy physics, theoretical high-energy physics, and astrophysics.

Physics Letters B is part of the SCOAP3 initiative.

References

See also
 List of periodicals published by Elsevier

Physics journals
Publications established in 1962
Elsevier academic journals